The Mississippi Sandhill Crane National Wildlife Refuge was established in 1975 to safeguard the endangered Mississippi sandhill crane and its unique disappearing wet pine savanna habitat. The Refuge Complex Manager also administers Grand Bay National Wildlife Refuge (Mississippi/Alabama) and Bon Secour National Wildlife Refuge (Alabama).

References
Refuge website

National Wildlife Refuges in Mississippi
Protected areas of Jackson County, Mississippi
Gulf Coast of the United States
Protected areas established in 1975